Passant Shawky (born December 14, 1983)  is an Egyptian actress.

Early life 
Passant studied Business Administration at the American University. In 2009, she traveled to Argentina to participate in the Fear Factor Xtreme Show.

In 2012, she joined a training course at Maggie Flanigan's studio in New York City, and went to Passant to act in 2013, where she participated during this year in the series, .

Career 
Passant started her acting career in 2011 through the theatrical show Tales of Liberation with director Sundus Shabayek, and in the same year she joined a training workshop in acting with Ahmed Kamal and Marwa Gabriel, and the following year she joined a training course at Maggie Flanigan's studio in New York City. Basant turned to acting in cinema and television in 2013, where she participated during this year in the series temporary name, and in the same year won her first movie championship through the movie Family Secrets after director Hani Fawzi discovered her.

Then her participation in the most famous works of art such as Under Control, Stiva, Free Fall, Nelly and Sherihan, Earth Joe, Case C, Kalbash 2.

Filmography

References

External links
 
 

1983 births
Living people